Banat dialect may refer to:
 Banat Bulgarian dialect
 Banat Romanian dialect

Language and nationality disambiguation pages